Ipe Salvador may refer to:

Felipe Salvador, Filipino revolutionary during the American occupation of the Philippines
Phillip Salvador, actor from the Philippines